Somnia may refer to
 Somnia (film), a 2016 American horror film
 Somnia, a book of poetry by A. W. Yrjänä
 The Somnia, the sons of Somnus, the Roman god of sleep
 Somnia, a 2021 album by English rock band Hawkwind